The Steyr is a river in Upper Austria. Its length is approx. .

Rising in the Totes Gebirge at Hinterstoder, it flows into the Enns in the town Steyr. There both rivers form a "Y". The city of Steyr uses this "Y" for marketing purposes.

Tributaries

References

External links

Rivers of Upper Austria
Steyr
Rivers of Austria